"Holiday" (stylized in all caps) is a song by American rapper and singer Lil Nas X. It was released on November 13, 2020, through Columbia Records, as a standalone single. A preview of the song, titled "The Origins of Holiday", was released on November 8. It is a Christmas-themed song, described as a stopgap single between his debut EP 7 and follow-up single "Montero (Call Me by Your Name)".

Music videos

"The Origins of Holiday" (trailer)
The music video for "The Origins of Holiday" trailer was directed by Jason Koenig, and produced by Ron Perry, Saul Levitz, Bridgitte Pugh. It has Lil Nas X overtaking the identity of Santa Claus, in a fashion similar to Tim Allen's character in the 1994 film The Santa Clause, and features Michael J. Fox as the character of Marty McFly from the Back to the Future film series.

"Holiday"
The music video for "Holiday" was directed by Gibson Hazard and Lil Nas X, and features Lil Nas X as a futuristic Santa Claus in his workshop on December 24, 2020.

Promotion

Roblox concert 
On November 10, 2020, Roblox announced the "Lil Nas X Concert Experience", that began on November 14, 2020, at 1pm PST. The concert was used to promote the single, with Lil Nas X singing a variety of his popular songs through a large avatar. The event was widely considered a success, with it receiving over 33 million views and is Roblox's most popular concert with nearly 1 million concurrent viewers.

Charts

Weekly charts

Year-end charts

Certifications

Release history

References

External links
 

2020 songs
2020 singles
American Christmas songs
Back to the Future (franchise)
Columbia Records singles
Lil Nas X songs
Songs written by Lil Nas X
Songs written by Tay Keith
Roblox
Song recordings produced by Take a Daytrip
Song recordings produced by Tay Keith